Yvette Naubert (September 19, 1918 – December 1, 1982) was a Canadian writer and playwright.

The daughter of Jean-Marie Naubert and Theodora D'Aoust, she was born in Hull and received a Bachelor of Music from the École de musique Vincent-d'Indy in Montreal. From 1946 to 1952, she wrote drama for Radio Canada. After spending some time in the United States, Naubert produced a number of novels:
 La dormeuse éveillée (1965)
 Contes de la solitude (1967)
 L'été de la cigale (1968), which received the Prix du Cercle du livre de France and the Prix David
 Les Pierrefendre (1972)
She was writer in residence at the University of Ottawa in 1980.

Naubert died in Ottawa at the age of 64.

Île Yvette-Naubert, a small island in the Ottawa River near the Val-Tétreau neighbourhood of Gatineau, was named in her honour. Avenue Yvette-Naubert in Montreal also takes its name from her.

References 

1918 births
1982 deaths
20th-century Canadian novelists
20th-century Canadian dramatists and playwrights
Canadian women novelists
Canadian women dramatists and playwrights
Writers from Gatineau
20th-century Canadian women writers
Canadian novelists in French
Canadian dramatists and playwrights in French